Iacobeni is a commune located in Sibiu County, Transylvania, Romania.

At the 2011 Romanian census, 60.2% of inhabitants were Romanians, 35.8% Roma, and 1.3% Germans (more specifically Transylvanian Saxons). At the 1930 census, 59% were Germans, 40.1% Romanians, and 0.9% Hungarians.

Villages 

The commune is composed of five villages: Iacobeni, Movile (formerly Hundrubechiu), Netuș, Noiștat, and Stejărișu (formerly Proștea). Each of them has a fortified church.

Movile 

Movile is a village noted for its medieval fortifications constructed by German immigrants at the behest of the Hungarian King in the 12th and 13th centuries.

In 1910 the population was 247 Saxons. Movile was part of Austria-Hungary until 1918, when it was transferred to Romania. By 1992, all of the Germans had left and the population was made up of 347 ethnic Romanians.

References

External links 

  "Movile" information and photographs

Communes in Sibiu County
Localities in Transylvania